William C. Conway (May 15, 1865 – 1969) was an American neo-Druid and the leader of a mystical sect in the Latter Day Saint movement that combined the teachings of Joseph Smith with Druidry and some of the ideas of  Aleister Crowley and the Ordo Templi Orientis.

A native of Redondo Beach, California, Conway was a member of the Church of Jesus Christ of Latter-day Saints (LDS Church) and held the office of high priest in the Melchizedek priesthood and bishop  in the Aaronic priesthood. Conway was also a member of the Ordo Templi Orientis (O.T.O.), and was initiated into the XI° order of the O.T.O. on January 1, 1945 by Franklin Thomas or perhaps at some earlier date by Victor Neuburg. In the O.T.O., Conway was referred to as Tau Lucifer II.

In the early 1950s, Conway began to claim that he had possession of the Urim and Thummim and the seer stone that Joseph Smith used to translate the Book of Mormon. He generally accepted the teachings of Mormonism, but began to teach that the LDS Church had been incorrect to abandon the practice of plural marriage, which Smith had taught. Conway also believed in the major tenets of Druidry—particularly reincarnation—and sought to incorporate them into Mormonism.

In 1955, a Zapotec tribe of the Yucatan Peninsula in Mexico declared Conway to be a prophet and the mouthpiece of Jesus Christ. Conway began claiming that he was the reincarnation of Moroni, a prophet in the Book of Mormon, and that a reincarnated Joseph Smith, "Our Druid Brother", had visited him. In 1958, Conway published an open letter wherein he set out a number of his beliefs. He taught that menstrual blood was corrupt and that menstruation could be eliminated through righteousness. He also taught that through priesthood alchemy, common metals could be transmutated into gold and that a Book of Mormon prophet named Mulek had blessed Los Angeles to be a holy gathering place. Conway taught that the "One Mighty and Strong" prophesied of in Mormon scripture was a nineteenth-century "young white Indian" from Yucatan named Eachta Eachta Na.

Conway established a church which he called the Perfected Church of Jesus Christ of Immaculate Latter-day Saints, which he sometimes referred to as the Restored Apostolic Church of Jesus Christ of Immaculate Latter-day Saints.

Conway's partner was a Zapotec woman who gave birth to twins in 1956; Conway declared that she had conceived by means of an "immaculate conception". Conway died at the age of 104.

Notes

References

Kate B. Cater (1969). Denominations that Base their Beliefs on the Teachings of Joseph Smith, the Mormon Prophet (Salt Lake City, Utah: Daughters of Utah Pioneers)
Russell R. Rich (1967, 2d ed.). Those Who Would be Leaders: Offshoots of Mormonism (Provo, Utah: Brigham Young University)
Steven L. Shields (1990, 4th ed.). Divergent Paths of the Restoration (Independence, Mo.: Herald House) 
Jerald and Sandra Tanner (1988). The Lucifer–God Doctrine (Salt Lake City, Utah: Utah Lighthouse Ministry)

1865 births
1969 deaths
American centenarians
American leaders of the Church of Jesus Christ of Latter-day Saints
Latter Day Saint leaders
Members of Ordo Templi Orientis
Men centenarians
Neo-druids
People from Redondo Beach, California
Prophets in Mormonism